Charles Deering Donohue (October 11, 1880 in New York City – March 5, 1928 in Manhattan, New York City) was an American lawyer and Democratic politician from New York.

Life
Donohue was a member of the New York State Assembly from 1913 to 1923; and was Minority Leader from 1918 to 1923.

He was a justice of the New York Supreme Court from 1924 until his death in 1928.

He died on March 5, 1928, at his home at 322 Central Park West in Manhattan, from acute indigestion; and was buried at the Calvary Cemetery in Woodside, Queens.

Sources
 JUSTICE DONOHUE DIES SUDDENLY in NYT on March 6, 1928 (subscription required)
 MEMORIAL OF JUSTICE CHARLES D. DONOHUE by James A. Foley, in Yearbook of the New York County Lawyers' Association

1880 births
1928 deaths
People from Manhattan
Democratic Party members of the New York State Assembly
New York Supreme Court Justices
Burials at Calvary Cemetery (Queens)
20th-century American judges
20th-century American politicians